Guibourtinidol is a flavan-3ol. It can be found in the heartwood of Cassia abbreviata.

References

Flavanols